Ivo Cassol (born January 20, 1959) is a Brazilian politician. He has represented Rondônia in the Federal Senate since 2011. Previously, he was Governor of Rondônia from 2004 to 2010, when he resigned to seek election to the Senate. He is a member of the Progressive Party.

References

Living people
1959 births
Members of the Federal Senate (Brazil)
Progressistas politicians